Big Brother 2 was the second season of the reality show Big Brother in Bulgaria. The show was aired on Nova Television.

The show started on 19 September 2005 and ended on 19 December 2005. It was hosted by Niki Kanchev and Evelina Pavlova. The chief editor was Nikolay Nikolov, the director was Petko Spasov and the voice of Big Brother was the actor Petar Meltev. The winner was Miroslav Atanasov. He won 200 000 leva.

Housemates
15 Housemates entered the House on Day 1, and another 1 on Day 8. Daniela, Leonardo and Maya entered on Day 51.

Daniela 
Daniela Dimitrova is from Blagoevgrad. She entered the house on Day 51 and was eleventh evicted on Day 85. Daniela celebrated her 25th birthday during her stay in the house. There was going to be a party with her favourite pop-folk singer Anelia. However, the party was cancelled as a punishment, because Ivan broke a major rule in the house - he covered the camera in the toilet in order to masturbate. Before entering the house, Daniela was given a secret task - to seduce one of the men in the house. The same mission was given to Maya. Daniela chose Miroslav. The jury, which had to decide whether their tasks were successful was Miroslav's wife - Elena. She recognized her task as successful, so Daniela was not nominated.

Elena G. 
Elena Georgieva is from Sofia. She entered the house on Day 1 and was the fourth evicted on Day 37 (left on Day 38). She entered the house with her husband Miroslav. They were given a secret task by Big Brother - for a week not to tell anyone that they were married, even to pretend that they had never met before. Their task was successful. However, their marriage collapsed - Elena fell in love with another housemate - Marian. At the end, Miroslav won the money. However, they didn't cut their relationships and some people think they played a role in order to take the big prize.

Elena R. 
Elena Romele is from Sofia. She entered the house on Day 8 - she was chosen by the viewers to enter the show. Before that, Elena was given a secret mission - to help the married couple save their secret. She was the tenth evicted on Day 78.

Irena 
Irena Vasileva is from Sofia. She entered the house on Day 1 and was the twelfth evicted on Day 87.

Ivan 
Ivan Naydenov is from Sofia (lives in Bristol). He entered the house on Day 1 and was the thirteenth evicted on Day 89, receiving the fewest positive votes.

Leonardo 

Leonardo Bianchi "Leo" is from Ancona (Italy). He entered the house on Day 51 and finished second in the finale on Day 92. Leonardo was given a secret task - to make the other housemates nominate him with most negative points. This would immune him from being nominated. However, he failed the mission and was automatically nominated by Big Brother.

Marian 
Marian Zahariev is from Sofia. He entered the house on Day 1 and was the eighth evicted on Day 64. He was involved in romantic relationships with two of his housemates - Elena and Maya. The mother of his daughter - Eva, was a contestant in Big Brother 3.

Maya 
Maya Yotsova is from Sofia. She entered the house on Day 51 and was the ninth evicted on Day 71. Before entering the house, she was given the same task as Daniela - to seduce one of the male housemates. She chose Marian and her task was successful.

Miglena 
Miglena Kamenova is from Gomotarci (near Vidin). She entered the house on Day 1 and was the sixth evicted on Day 50.

Miroslav 
Miroslav Atanasov is from Sofia. He entered the house on Day 1 and became a winner on Day 92. He entered the house with his wife - Elena. They were given a secret mission.

Nedyalko 
Nedyalko Lazarov is from Yambol. He entered the house on Day 1 and was the second evicted on Day 22.

Petko 
Petko Vasilev is from Sofia. He entered the house on Day 1 and was the first evicted on Day 15.

Plamena 
Plamena Nikolaeva is from Ruse. She entered the house on Day 1 and was the fifth evicted on Day 43.

Radomira 
Radomira Kosadzhieva is from Lom. She entered the house on Day 1 and was the seventh evicted on Day 57.

Radoslav 
Radoslav Stoyanov "Rado" is from Petrich. He entered the house on Day 1. On the very first night in the house, the housemates were given the task to decide which one of them not to receive his luggage during his/her whole stay in the house. Rado entered the show wearing underwear only, so he received the most votes. Rado left the house voluntarily on Day 8.

Silva B. 
Silva Bratanova is from Sofia. She entered the house on Day 1 and walked on Day 8.

Silvia D. 
Silvia Dragoeva is from Varna (lives in Sofia). She entered the house on Day 1 and was the third evicted on Day 29.

Stefan 
Stefan Kemalov "Bat Sali" is from Kazanlak. He entered the house on Day 1 and finished third in the finale on Day 92. He is the first housemate of Gypsy origin.

Zvezdelin 
Zvezdelin Minchev "Vego" is from Plovdiv. He entered the house on Day 1 and finished fourth in the finale on Day 92.

Weekly summary and highlights

Nominations table
The first housemate in each box was nominated for two points, and the second housemate was nominated for one point.

Notes 

 : Nedyalko's nominations were declared void as he had been discussing nominations. As punishment Nedalko was nominated by Big Brother.
 : Marian was nominated by Big Brother because he refused to nominate two of his housemates.
 : Big Brother had previously told Leonardo that he would automatically be up for eviction unless he received the most nominations, as the person with the highest number of nomination points would be immune from eviction. Leonardo failed his secret mission.

References

External links 
 The official website of Big Brother 2

2005 Bulgarian television seasons
 2
2005 Bulgarian television series endings